Lebel-sur-Quévillon Airport  is a registered aerodrome located  southwest of Lebel-sur-Quévillon, Quebec, Canada.

References

External links

Registered aerodromes in Nord-du-Québec